The 2008 Vuelta a Castilla y León was the 23rd edition of the Vuelta a Castilla y León road cycling stage race, started on 24 March in Valsain, and concluded on 28 March in Riaño. The race was won by Alberto Contador.

Teams
Sixteen teams of up to eight riders started the race:

 
 
 
 
 
 
 
 
 
 
 
 
 Extremadura–Gruppo Gallardo

Final standings

Jersey progress

References

External links

2008
2008 in Spanish road cycling